was a town in Nishisonogi District, Nagasaki Prefecture, Japan.

As of 2003, the town had an estimated population of 2,126 and a density of 150.57 persons per km². The total area was 14.12 km².

On April 1, 2005, Sakito, along with the towns of Saikai (former), Ōseto, Ōshima and Seihi (all from Nishisonogi District), was merged to create the city of Saikai.

External links
 Saikai official website 

Dissolved municipalities of Nagasaki Prefecture